Camisio Teodoro Gellings (born 1880 in Germany) was a German clergyman and bishop for the Roman Catholic Diocese of Wewak. He was ordained in 1907. He was appointed bishop in 1913. He died in 1959.

References 

1880 births
1959 deaths
German Roman Catholic bishops
Roman Catholic bishops of Wewak
20th-century German Roman Catholic priests